Anil Kumar Singh is an Indian professor of chemistry at Indian Institute of Technology Bombay.

In 2011–2014 he was Vice-chancellor of the University of Allahabad, having held the same post at  Bundelkhand University  in 2007.

References

Year of birth missing (living people)
Living people
20th-century Indian chemists
Academic staff of IIT Bombay